The discography of Carlos Santana, a Mexican-American rock guitarist, consists of seven studio albums, three live albums, six compilation albums and five singles.

In his early music career he formed the Latin band Santana, named after his surname. As a solo-artist he  released several albums. Two of his earliest studio albums, his debut album Love Devotion Surrender with John McLaughlin and the second album, Illuminations, with Alice Coltrane, were collaborations. He then released four studio albums as a solo artist, two of which were released under his spiritual name "Devadip Carlos Santana". His latest released studio album, Santana Brothers, was a collaboration between his nephew Carlos Hernandez and his brother Jorge Santana.

Only two of his prior released albums, his debut album Love Devotion Surrender, and the live album Carlos Santana & Buddy Miles! Live! received a certification from the national American certification. He has also collaborated on twenty-seven albums with numerous artists, such as Chad Kroeger and Steven Tyler, and appeared in forty-nine albums as a guest guitarist. 

In February 1976, Santana was presented with fifteen gold disc in Australia, representing sales in excess of 244,000.

Rolling Stone named Santana number fifteen on their list of the 100 Greatest Guitarists of All Time in 2003.

Albums

Studio albums

Live albums

Compilation albums

Collaboration albums

Singles

Notes

A : This track is an instrumental or a non-single, but it did chart.

Guest appearances

See also

 Santana (band) discography
 Santana videography

References

Sources

External links

 
 Unofficial German site
 

Discographies of American artists
Discography
Discographies of Mexican artists